The Exeter Inn (also known as The Inn at Exeter) is an inn in Exeter, New Hampshire, United States. Located on Front Street on the campus of Phillips Exeter Academy, the Georgian style complex was built in 1932 and mirrors the school's architectural motif. Guests, including parents of many Academy students, enjoy the short walk to historic downtown Exeter. 

A previous Exeter Inn had been located on Water Street; one of the town's oldest buildings, it was demolished in 1959. The hotel, which frequently hosts events for New Hampshire primary candidates, is home to the Epoch Restaurant and Bar.

History 
The Exeter Inn was built in 1932 with a donation to Phillips Exeter from the wife and daughter of engineer and academy alumnus William Boyce Thompson. The land on which the inn sits was purchased by the academy's class of 1890 from alumnus William P. Chadwick in 1890. For the first 75 years of its existence, the inn belonged to Phillips Exeter Academy, until it was transferred to the leasing company Someplace(s) Different on October 31, 1997. In 2007 new owners undertook a sweeping renovation that significantly changed the 46-room inn's entrances, lobby, and decor. In 2011, HayCreek Hotels purchased the Exeter Inn.

References

External links
The Exeter Inn official website
Hotels in New Hampshire
Hotels established in 1932
Hotel buildings completed in 1932
Exeter, New Hampshire
1932 establishments in New Hampshire